The Bishop of Winchester Academy is a co-educational secondary school and sixth form with academy status, located in the Charminster area of Bournemouth in the English county of Dorset.

The school was first established in 1953 as Summerbee Secondary Modern School. The original school building was designed by the borough architect John Burton, and was named after Alderman Frank Summerbee, who sat on the town's education committee. The school was opened by Cllr. Harry Mears in September 1953. The school later became a community comprehensive school.

In 2004 the school was formally taken over by the Church of England Diocese of Winchester, and became a voluntary aided school. It was also renamed The Bishop of Winchester School, named after the Bishop of Winchester. On 1 September 2010 the school converted to academy status and was renamed The Bishop of Winchester Academy.

The Bishop of Winchester Academy offers GCSEs and BTECs programmes of study for pupils, while students in the sixth form have the option to study from a range of A Levels, Cambridge Technicals and further BTECs. The school also has a specialism in mathematics.

References

External links
The Bishop of Winchester Academy official website
The Bishop of Winchester Academy sixth form

Educational institutions established in 1953
1953 establishments in England
Schools in Bournemouth
Secondary schools in Bournemouth, Christchurch and Poole
Church of England secondary schools in the Diocese of Winchester
Academies in Bournemouth, Christchurch and Poole